Tiki is a unisex given name. It is also used as a surname. People with the name include:

Male
Tiki Barber (born 1975), American football player 
Tiki Fulwood (1944–1979), American musician
Tiki Ghosn (born 1977), American professional mixed martial artist
Tiki Lafe (born 1953), Malaysian politician
Tiki Nxumalo (1950–2015), South African actor
Tiki Taane (born 1976), New Zealand Maori musician

Female
Tiki Gelana (born 1987), Ethiopian marathon runner
Tiki Tsang (born 1968), Australian former actress

Stage name
 Tiki King, stage name of Patrick Baron (born 1963), American artist and musician

Surname
Sabarmatee Tiki (born c. 1969), Indian conservationist and farmer

See also
 Tiki, disambiguation page

Unisex given names